Defiance is the second album by the female-fronted industrial metal act Lahannya.

Track listing
 "Prelude" – 1:08
 "Dying Inside" – 3:51
 "Sick and Tired" – 3:48
 "Brave New World" – 4:15
 "Burn" – 4:06
 "Adrenaline" – 4:27
 "Open Your Eyes" – 4:34
 "Interference" – 3:58
 "Piece by Piece" – 4:27
 "Kill Me if You Care" – 4:39
 "No Way Out" – 3:21
 "Our War" – 4:26

Lahannya albums
2009 albums